Thucydides Trap, or Thucydides' Trap, is a term popularized by American political scientist Graham T. Allison to describe an apparent tendency towards war when an emerging power threatens to displace an existing great power as a regional or international hegemon. It was coined and is primarily used to describe a potential conflict between the United States and the People's Republic of China.

The term is based on a quotation of ancient Athenian historian and military general Thucydides, in which he posited that the Peloponnesian War between Athens and Sparta had been inevitable because of Spartan fears of the growth of Athenian power.

Supporting the thesis, Graham Allison led a study at Harvard University's Belfer Center for Science and International Affairs which found that among 16 historical instances of an emerging power rivaling a ruling power, 12 ended in war. That study, however, has come under considerable criticism, and scholarly opinion on the veracity of the Thucydides Trap—particularly as it relates to a potential U.S.–China military conflict—is divided.

Origin

The term was coined by American political scientist Graham T. Allison in a 2012 article for the Financial Times. Based on a quote by ancient Athenian historian and military general Thucydides in his text History of the Peloponnesian War positing that "it was the rise of Athens and the fear that this instilled in Sparta that made war inevitable", Allison used the term to describe a tendency towards war when a rising power (exemplified by Athens) challenges the status of a dominant power (exemplified by Sparta). Allison expanded upon the term significantly in his 2017 book Destined for War, in which he argued that "China and the US are currently on a collision course for war".

Definition
The term describes the theory that when a great power's position as hegemon is threatened by an emerging power, there is a significant likelihood of war between the two powers. In Graham Allison's words:
Thucydides's Trap refers to the natural, inevitable discombobulation that occurs when a rising power threatens to displace a ruling power...[and] when a rising power threatens to displace a ruling power, the resulting structural stress makes a violent clash the rule, not the exception.

To advance his thesis, Allison led a case study by the Harvard University Belfer Center for Science and International Affairs which found that among 16 historical instances of an emerging power rivaling a ruling power, 12 ended in war.

Influence
The term and arguments surrounding it have had influence in international media (including Chinese state media) and among American and Chinese politicians. A case study of the term by Alan Greeley Misenheimer published by the Institute for National Strategic Studies, the military research arm of the National Defense University, stated that it "has received global attention since entering the international relations lexicon". Foreign policy scholars Hal Brands and Michael Beckley have stated that the Thucydides Trap has "become canonical", a "truism now invoked, ad nauseam, in explaining U.S.–China rivalry". Furthermore, BBC diplomatic correspondent Jonathan Marcus has quipped that Graham Allison's book expanding on the Thucydides trap, Destined For War, "has become required reading for many policymakers, academics and journalists".

China–United States relations

The term is primarily used and was coined in relation to a potential military conflict between the United States and the People's Republic of China. Chinese leader and CCP general secretary Xi Jinping referenced the term, cautioning that "We all need to work together to avoid the Thucydides trap". The term gained further influence in 2018 as a result of a surge in US-Chinese tensions after US President Donald Trump imposed tariffs on almost half of China's exports to the US, leading to a trade war.

Western scholars have noted that there are a number of pressing issues the two nations are at odds over that increase the likelihood of the two powers falling into the Thucydides trap, including the continued de facto independence of Taiwan pushed by Western countries, contrary to the Three Communiqués and the UN recognition of One China, China's digital policing and its use of cyber espionage, similar to the US digital policing of the NSA and other government agencies, differing policies towards North Korea, China's increased naval presence in the Pacific and its claims over the South China Sea, bodies of water directly adjacent to China, and human rights issues in Xinjiang, Tibet, and Hong Kong, similar to human rights issues in the United States (see treatment of Black, Asian, Hispanic, and Indigenous peoples of the USA). Some also point to the consolidation of power by Xi Jinping, the belief in an irreconcilable differences in values, and the trade deficit as further evidence the countries may be slipping into the Thucydides trap.

Criticism

China–United States relations
A number of scholars have criticized the application of the Thucydides trap to US-China relations. For instance, Richard Hanania, a research fellow at Columbia University, has argued that there is no Thucydides Trap between the United States and China because China's ambitions are limited primarily to combating internal issues, signifying that China does not pose a significant threat to US interests. Lawrence Freedman, writing in Prism, the National Defense University's journal of complex operations, has similarly argued that "China’s main interest has always been its regional position, and if that is the case, then there are strong arguments for it to show patience, as its economic pull becomes progressively stronger". Hu Bo, a professor at Peking University's Institute of Ocean Research and one of China's foremost naval strategists, has also said that he does not believe the current balance of power between the United States and China supports the Thucydides hypothesis.

Scholars and journalists like Arthur Waldron and Ian Buruma have contended that China is still far too weak for such a conflict, pointing to China's "economic vulnerabilities", its aging population, an exodus of Chinese people out of China, domestic ecological problems, an inferior military relative to the United States, a weaker system of alliances than the United States, and a censorship regime that limits innovation. Foreign policy scholars Hal Brands and Michael Beckley have similarly argued that the Thucydides Trap "fundamentally misdiagnoses where China now finds itself on its arc of development", contending that it is China—and not the United States—that faces impending stagnation. Relatedly, Harvard University political scientist Joseph S. Nye has argued that the primary concern is not the rise of China leading to a Thucydides trap, but rather domestic issues leading to a weakening of China in what he calls a "Kindleberger Trap".

Others have derided the Thucydides Trap as a quaint piece of ancient history that is not particularly applicable to modern times. James Palmer, a deputy editor at Foreign Policy, in his article "Oh God, Not the Peloponnesian War Again", wrote of the Thucydides Trap that "conflicts between city-states in a backwater Eurasian promontory 2,000 years ago are an unreliable guide to modern geopolitics—and they neglect a vast span of world history that may be far more relevant". He further derisively noted that Thucydides shouldn't "hold the same grip on international relations scholars that Harry Potter does on millennial readers". Lawrence Freedman has similarly argued that "[t]he case studies deployed by Allison", which "come from times when issues of war and power were viewed differently than they are today", tell us "very little of value", concluding that "the Thucydides Trap is an unhelpful construct".

Finally, some have noted that Chinese state propaganda outlets have latched onto the narrative of the Thucydides trap in order to promote a set of power relations that favors China.

Methodological criticisms

Criticism of research into Thucydides Trap
The research by Graham Allison supporting the Thucydides trap has been criticized. Harvard University political scientist Joseph S. Nye has contested the claim that 12 of the 16 historical cases of a rising power rivaling a ruling power resulted in war on the basis that Allison misidentifies cases. For example, he points to the case of World War I, which Allison identifies as an instance of an emerging Germany rivaling a hegemonic Britain, saying that the war was also caused by "the fear in Germany of Russia's growing power, the fear of rising Slavic nationalism in a declining Austria-Hungary, as well as myriad other factors that differed from ancient Greece". Historian Arthur Waldron has similarly argued that Allison mischaracterizes several conflicts. For example, he says of the Japan–Russia conflict included by Allison: "Japan was the rising power in 1904 while Russia was long established. Did Russia therefore seek to preempt Japan? No. The Japanese launched a surprise attack on Russia, scuttling the Czar’s fleet." Lawrence Freedman, writing in Prism, the National Defense University's journal of complex operations, has likewise argued that Allison misunderstands the causes of several of his case studies, particularly World War I, which he argues resulted more from "the dispute between Austria and Serbia, and its mismanagement by their allies, Germany and Russia".

Foreign policy scholars Hal Brands and Michael Beckley have argued that, for many of the cases Allison identifies with the Thucydides Trap, the impetus that led to war was not the impending threat of a hegemonic power being surpassed but rather an emerging power lashing out when its rapid rise transmogrified into stagnation. They write:
[T]he calculus that produces war—particularly the calculus that pushes revisionist powers, countries seeking to shake up the existing system, to lash out violently—is more complex (than the Thucydides Trap). A country whose relative wealth and power are growing will surely become more assertive and ambitious. All things equal, it will seek greater global influence and prestige. But if its position is steadily improving, it should postpone a deadly showdown with the reigning hegemon until it has become even stronger...Now imagine a different scenario. A dissatisfied state has been building its power and expanding its geopolitical horizons. But then the country peaks, perhaps because its economy slows, perhaps because its own assertiveness provokes a coalition of determined rivals, or perhaps because both of these things happen at once. The future starts to look quite forbidding; a sense of imminent danger starts to replace a feeling of limitless possibility. In these circumstances, a revisionist power may act boldly, even aggressively, to grab what it can before it is too late. The most dangerous trajectory in world politics is a long rise followed by the prospect of a sharp decline.

They claim that several of Allison's cases in fact follow this pattern—and not that of the Thucydides Trap—including the Russo-Japanese War, World War I, and the Pacific War (they also point to America's imperial foray after the American Civil War and modern-day Russia under Vladimir Putin). They further claim that it is this effect that is more likely to push the United States and China into conflict, as China is "slowing economically and facing growing global resistance".

Peloponnesian War
Harvard University political scientist Joseph S. Nye, pointing to research by Yale historian Donald Kagan, has argued that Graham Allison misinterprets the Peloponnesian War; Nye argues that the war was not the result of a rising Athens challenging Sparta, but rather the consequence of Athenian stagnation leading Sparta to think that a number of "Athenian policy mistakes" made war "worth the risk". Historian Arthur Waldron likewise argued that Kagan and Harvard classics scholar Ernst Badian had "long ago proved that no such thing exists as the 'Thucydides Trap'" with regards to the Peloponnesian War. Relatedly, political scientists Athanassios Platias and Vasilis Trigkas submitted that the Thucydides Trap is based on "inadvertent escalation" whereas the Peloponnesian war was an outcome of rational calculations.

Others have questioned Allison's reading of Thucydides. In a case study for the Institute for National Strategic Studies, the military research arm of the National Defense University, Alan Greeley Misenheimer says that "Thucydides’ text does not support Allison's normative assertion about the 'inevitable' result of an encounter between 'rising' and 'ruling' powers" and that while it "draws welcome attention both to Thucydides and to the pitfalls of great power competition" it "fails as a heuristic device or predictive tool in the analysis of contemporary events".

See also
 Power transition theory
 Thucydides
 China's peaceful rise
 Chinese Century
 Clash of Civilizations
 Foreign relations of the United States
 Foreign relations of China
 Potential superpowers
 Global policeman
 Post–Cold War era
 Historic recurrence
 Envy, Jealousy

Notes

References

International relations
Geopolitical terminology
China–United States relations
2012 neologisms
Peloponnesian War
Greco-Roman military historiography
Political realism